The Iowa Stars were a hockey team that played in the Central Hockey League for the 1969–70 CHL season, after the former Memphis South Stars relocated. They played their home games at the McElroy Auditorium in Waterloo, Iowa. The franchise is not related to the AHL franchise of the same name. Bill Orban and Mike Chernoff led the team in scoring, with 75 points each.

References

Central Professional Hockey League teams
Defunct ice hockey teams in the United States
Ice hockey teams in Iowa
Ice hockey clubs established in 1969
Ice hockey clubs disestablished in 1970
Waterloo, Iowa
1969 establishments in Iowa
1970 disestablishments in Iowa